Russalpia is a genus of grasshoppers in the tribe Catantopini from Tasmania. The scientific name of this genus was first published in 1921 by Sjöstedt.

Species
The genus Russalpia includes the following species:
Russalpia albertisi Bolívar, 1898
Russalpia longifurca Key, 1991

References

Acrididae genera
Fauna of Tasmania